Motu (sometimes called Pure Motu or True Motu to distinguish it from Hiri Motu) is a Central Papuan Tip language that is spoken by the Motuans, an indigenous ethnic group of Papua New Guinea. It is commonly used today in the region, particularly around the capital, Port Moresby.

A simplified form of Motu developed as a trade language in the Papuan region, in the southeast of the main island of New Guinea, originally known as Police Motu, and today known as Hiri Motu. After Tok Pisin and English, Hiri Motu was at the time of independence the third most commonly spoken of the more than 800 languages of Papua New Guinea, although its use has been declining for some years, mainly in favour of Tok Pisin.

Motu is classified as one of the Malayo-Polynesian languages and bears some linguistic similarities to Polynesian and Micronesian languages.

Phonology 
Motu is a typical Austronesian language in that it is heavily vowel-based. Every Motu syllable ends in a vowel sound — this may be preceded by a single consonant (there are no "consonant clusters"). Vowel sounds may be either monophthongs (consisting of a single basic sound) or diphthongs (consisting of more than one basic sound). 

There are only five vowel sounds ; Motu diphthongs are written and pronounced as combinations of two vowels. The sounds oi and oe, ai and ae, au and ao (approximately like English boy, high, cow), and r and l are distinguished in Motu but not in Hiri Motu. There is no letter f; when it occurs in loan words, it is usually represented as p.

References

 Dutton, Tom (1985). Police Motu: Iena Sivarai (its story). Port Moresby, Papua New Guinea: University of Papua New Guinea Press.
 Taylor, Andrew J. (1970). Syntax and phonology of Motu: a transformational approach.
 Lister-Turner, R and Clark, J.B. (1931), A Dictionary of the Motu Language of Papua, Second Edition (P. Chatterton, ed). Sydney, New South Wales: Government Printer.
 Brett, Richard; Brown, Raymond; Brown, Ruth and Foreman, Velma. (1962), A Survey of Motu and Police Motu. Ukarumpa, Papua New Guinea: SIL International.
Wurm, S.A. and Harris, J.B., Police Motu, Canberra: SIL International, 1963
 External links

 William George Lawes, Grammar and vocabulary of language spoken by Motu tribe (New Guinea)
 first edition, Sydney: Thomas Richards, 1885.
 second and revised edition, Sydney: Charles Potter, 1888.
 third and enlarged edition, Sydney: Charles Potter, 1896.
 Paradisec has a number of collections that include materials on Motu languages

Central Papuan Tip languages
Languages of Central Province (Papua New Guinea)